Fernando Álvarez Monje (born 4 February 1968) is a Mexican politician affiliated with the National Action Party. As of 2014 he served as Deputy of the LIX Legislature of the Mexican Congress representing Chihuahua.

References

1968 births
Living people
Politicians from Chihuahua (state)
20th-century Mexican lawyers
National Action Party (Mexico) politicians
21st-century Mexican politicians
Monterrey Institute of Technology and Higher Education alumni
Deputies of the LIX Legislature of Mexico
Members of the Chamber of Deputies (Mexico) for Chihuahua (state)
21st-century Mexican lawyers